Parri Spinelli ( – 1453) was an Italian (Tuscan) painter of the early renaissance who was born in the Province of Arezzo.  His father and teacher was Spinello Aretino (1350–1410), who was active throughout Tuscany.  Parri Spinelli lived in Florence from 1411 or 1412 to 1419, and was a member of the workshop of Lorenzo Ghiberti.  He became the most important painter in Arezzo upon his return.  Spinelli died in 1453 in Arezzo Province.  His paintings are notable for their bold colors and figures that are more elongated than those of his predecessors.

References
Encyclopedia of World Art, New York, McGraw-Hill, 1959–1987.
Siren, Osvald, 'Pictures by Parri Spinelli', The Burlington Magazine, vol. 49, No. 282 (Sep., 1926), pp. 117–25.
Vasari, Giorgio, Le Vite delle più eccellenti pittori, scultori, ed architettori, many editions and translations.
Zucker, Mark J., Parri Spinelli's Lost Annunciation to the Virgin and Other Aretine Annunciations of the Fourteenth and Fifteenth Centuries, The Art Bulletin, vol. 57, No. 2 (Jun., 1975), pp. 186–95.

External links

Works by Parri Spinelli on Artcyclopedia

15th-century Italian painters
Italian male painters
Painters from Tuscany
1387 births
1453 deaths
Year of birth uncertain